The United States competed at the 2011 Pan American Games in Guadalajara, Mexico, from October 14 to October 30, 2011.

The chef de mission for the United States for these Pan American Games was Alan Ashley, the USOC's Chief of Sport Performance. The city of Houston, Texas, served as the processing center for athletes participating in the 2011 Pan American Games.

Medalists

Archery

The United States has qualified a team of 6 athletes, 3 male and 3 female. The representatives were selected at a qualification event at the National Target Championships.

Men

Women

Athletics

The United States will be represented in the athletics competition.

Men
Track and road events

*-Indicates athletes that participated in the preliminaries but not the finals

Field events

* - Hicks finished 4th in the competition but the original gold medalist, Victor Castillo of Venezuela, was disqualified on November 9, 2011, after he tested positive for performance-enhancing drugs.

Combined events – Decathlon

Women
Track and road events

Field events

Combined events – Heptathlon

Badminton

The United States has qualified four male and four female athletes. USA Badminton submitted a list of prospective nominees to represent the United States at the Pan American Games, which were subject to approval by the USOC: The final nominees are subject to final approval and include all prospective nominees except Cee Ketpura, who withdrew for personal reasons.

Men

Women

Mixed

Baseball

The United States has qualified a baseball team of twenty athletes to participate. The team will compete in Group A.

Team
The United States Pan American Games baseball team, which will also be sent to the 2011 IBAF Baseball World Cup, was announced in September. The team is as follows:

General Manager: Eric Campbell
Manager: Ernie Young
Coaches: Kirk Champion – Pitching Coach; Leon Durham – Hitting Coach; Jay Bell, Roly de Armas – Assistant Coaches
Head Athletic Trainer: John Fierro; Assistant Athletic Trainer: Christopher Gebeck; Team Physicians: Fred Dicke, Angelo Mattalino

Standings

Results

Preliminary round

Semifinal

Final

Final rank:

Basketball

Both the men's and women's teams of the United States qualified for the basketball tournament automatically.

Men
Instead of sending college-level basketball players to represent the United States, USA Basketball has decided to work with the NBA Development League (NBA D-League), the minor league of the NBA, to send D-League players to represent the United States in the men's tournament. The men's team will be headed by coach Nate Tibbetts, the head coach of the Tulsa 66ers.

The men's basketball team will compete in Group B.

Team
The roster of the men's basketball team is as follows:

|}
| valign="top" |
 Head coach
 
 Assistant coaches
 
 
Athletic trainer
 
Team physician
 

Legend
 nat field describes country of  last club before the tournament
 Age field is age on October 12, 2011
|}

Standings

Preliminary round results

Semifinals

Bronze medal match

Final rank:

Women
The women's basketball team will compete in Group A.

Team
The roster of the women's basketball team is as follows:

|}
| valign="top" |
 Head coach
 
 Assistant coaches
 
 
Athletic trainer
 
Team physician
 

Legend
 nat field describes country of  last club before the tournament
 Age field is age on October 12, 2011
|}

Preliminary round

Seventh place game

Final rank: 7

Basque pelota

The United States has qualified a total of six athletes for four of the ten basque pelota events.

Men

Beach volleyball

The United States has qualified one pair of athletes each for the men's and women's tournaments.

Men

Women

Bowling

The United States has qualified four bowlers, two male and two female. The representatives will be chosen based on their performances at the USBC Masters/USBC Queens, at the US Open of Bowling, and at the Pan American Games bowling trials.

Men
Bill O'Neill and Chris Barnes were the top competitors at the qualification trials and had excellent performances at the USBC Masters and the US Open of Bowling. Based on these performances, they were the top two qualified athletes in the qualification system. They will represent the United States at these Pan American Games in men's bowling.

Individual

Pairs

Women
The United States will be represented by Kelly Kulick and Liz Johnson in the women's bowling competition. The qualification was based on the competitors' performances at the USBC Queens and the US Women's Open of Bowling and on performances at the women's bowling qualification event held during May 2–3. Kulick and Johnson were announced as the representatives following the US Women's Open's conclusion.

Individual

Pairs

Boxing

The United States has qualified a total of eight athletes to compete in Guadalajara. In the first qualifier, the United States qualified one athlete in the men's super heavyweight category. In the second qualifier, the United States qualified one athlete in the men's light heavyweight category, one athlete in the women's light welterweight category, and one athlete in the women's light heavyweight category. In the third qualifier, the United States qualified four athletes in the men's flyweight, lightweight, welterweight, and middleweight categories.

Men

Women

Canoeing

The United States has qualified a total of five boats to compete in the K-1 200, K-2 100, K-1 200 women, K-1 500 women, and the K-2 500 women's competition.

Men

Women

Cycling

The United States has qualified sixteen athletes to compete at the cycling competition.

Road cycling
The United States has qualified three female athletes to compete in the road cycling competition.

Women

Track cycling
The United States has qualified one team of male athletes to compete in the team sprint track cycling competition.

Sprints

Keirin

Mountain biking
The United States qualified three athletes, two male and one female, to compete in the mountain biking cycling competition.

BMX
The United States qualified four athletes, two male and two female, to compete in the BMX cycling competition.

Diving

The United States will be sending divers to compete in the diving competition.

Men

Women

Equestrian

The United States will be sending an equestrian team to compete. The United States Equestrian Federation (USEF) released a short list of riders nominated to represent the United States. The final squad was named and sent to the USOC, IOC and FEI on September 12.

Following is the short list released by the USEF on July 27, including substitutes:

Following is a list of the final nomination of the USEF and the official entries into the Pan American Games:

Dressage

 The final score is based on the Grand Prix for the team event and the Grand Prix Special and Grand Prix Freestyle for the individual event.

Eventing

Individual jumping

Team jumping

Fencing

The United States has qualified a total of sixteen athletes, eight male and eight female athletes, to compete in the individual and team events for the épée, foil, and sabre of each gender. The fencers who will be representing the United States are as follows:

Men

Women

Field hockey

The United States has qualified a men's and women's field hockey team to compete in their respective tournaments.

Men

Team
The United States men's field hockey team is as follows:

 Kevin Barber
 Pat Cota
 Ajai Dhadwal
 Michiel Dijxhoorn
 John Ginolfi
 Sean Harris
 Will Holt
 Steve Mann
 Jarred Martin
 Shawn Nakamura
 Moritz Runzi
 Ian Scully
 Rob Schilling
 Andy Sheridan
 Tom Sheridan
 Tyler Sundeen

Results
The United States men's team will compete in Pool B of the men's group.

5th-8th semifinal

5th place match

Final rank: 5

Women

Team
The United States women's field hockey team is as follows:

 Kayla Bashore-Smedley
 Michelle Cesan
 Lauren Crandall
 Rachel Dawson
 Katelyn Falgowski
 Melissa Gonzalez
 Michelle Kasold
 Claire Laubach
 Caroline Nichols
 Katie O'Donnell
 Julia Reinprecht
 Katie Reinprecht
 Paige Selenski
 Amy Swensen
 Shannon Taylor
 Michelle Vittese

Results
The United States women's team will compete in Pool B of the women's group.

Semifinals

Gold medal match

Final rank:

Gymnastics

The United States has qualified a total of 24 athletes in 3 events.

Artistic
The United States has qualified six male and six female athletes in artistic gymnastics.

Men
Team

Individual

Women
Team

Individual

Rhythmic
The United States has qualified two athletes to compete in the individual tournament and six athletes to compete in the group tournament.

Women

Individual

Group

Trampoline
The United States qualified two male and female athletes in trampoline gymnastics.

Handball

The United States has qualified a men's and women's handball team. The women's handball team qualified after defeating Canada in the Canada versus United States Series. The men's handball team qualified in a last chance qualifying tournament in Guatemala City after drawing with Uruguay and defeating Guatemala.

Men
The men's handball team will compete in Group B.

Team
The team that will be representing the United States in the men's tournament is as follows:

|}
| valign="top" |
 Head coach

 Assistant coach

 Team Leader

Legend
 Club denotes current club; nationality is of (first) club listed
 alt. denotes alternates
 Positions:
 G: Goalkeeper
 P: Pivot
 CB: Centre Back
 LW: Left Wing
 RW: Right Wing
 LB: Left Back
 RB: Right Back
|}

Preliminary round

5th-8th place semifinal

7th-8th place match

Final rank: 7th

Women
The women's handball team will compete in Group B.

Team
The team that will be representing the United States in the women's tournament is as follows:

|}
| valign="top" |
 Head coach

 Assistant coach

 Trainer

 Team Leader

Legend
 Club denotes current club; nationality is of (first) club listed
 alt. denotes alternates
 Positions:
 G: Goalkeeper
 P: Pivot
 CB: Centre Back
 LW: Left Wing
 RW: Right Wing
 LB: Left Back
 RB: Right Back
|}

Preliminary round

5th-8th place semifinal

7th place match

Final rank: 8th

Judo

The United States has qualified fourteen athletes, seven male and female athletes, to compete in all men's and women's judo competitions.

Men

Repechage rounds

Women

Repechage rounds

Karate

The United States has qualified three athletes in the 60 kg, 67 kg, and 75 kg men's categories and three athletes in the 50 kg, 55 kg, and 68 kg women's categories.

Men

Women

Modern pentathlon

The United States qualified two male and two female pentathletes.

Racquetball

The United States qualified four male and four female racquetball players.

Men

Women

Roller skating

The United States qualified three male and three female roller skaters.

Track skating

Free skating

Rugby sevens

The United States qualified a team to participate in rugby sevens. It consisted of 12 athletes.

Team

 Mark Bokhoven
 Colin Hawley
 Rocco Mauer
 Folau Niua
 Milemote Pulu
 Nu'u Punimata
 Blaine Scully
 Roland Suniula
 Shalom Suniula
 Zachary Test
 Peter Tiberio
 Maka Unufe

Results

Preliminary round
All times are Central Standard Time (UTC-6)

Quarterfinal

Semifinal

Bronze medal match

Rowing

The United States will send representatives to participate all fourteen events of the rowing competition. The finalized list of crews chosen to represent the United States was announced on September 27.

Men

Women

Sailing

The United States qualified nine boats and sixteen athletes to compete in all tournaments. The team was announced on April 18 by the US Sailing Olympic Selection Committee.

Men

Women

Open

Shooting

The United States will send 25 athletes to compete in the shooting competition. The team is as follows:

Men

Women

Softball

The United States has qualified a softball team.

Team
Following is the 2011 USA national softball team roster:
 Valerie Arioto
 Whitney Canion
 Kaitlin Cochran
 Lauren Gibson
 Kelly Grieve
 Taylor Hoagland
 Ashley Holcombe
 Molly Johnson
 Stacy Johnson
 Megan Langenfeld
 Jenae Leles
 Michelle Moultrie
 Christine Orgeron
 Keilani Ricketts
 Brittany Schutte
 Jordan Taylor
 Rhea Taylor
 Chelsea Thomas
 Jessica Shults (alternate)

Standings

Results

Semifinal

Final

Final rank:

Squash

The United States qualified three male and three female athletes to compete in the individual and team tournaments.

Men

Women

Swimming

The United States has qualified athletes to participate in the various swimming competitions. The United States will send a team to Guadalajara based on performances at the 2011 ConocoPhillips USA Swimming National Championships in Palo Alto, California, serving as the official selection meet for the 2011 Pan American Games United States swimming team. The National Championships were held in early August and USA Swimming announced the representatives.

Men

*-Indicates athletes that participated in the preliminaries but not finals

Women

*-Indicates athletes that participated in the preliminaries but not the finals.

Synchronized swimming

The United States has qualified a team and a duet to participate in the synchronized swimming competition.

Table tennis

The United States has qualified a men's and women's team of table tennis athletes, made of three athletes per team. The United States can qualify individual men's athletes through a special qualification tournament.

Men

Women

Taekwondo

The United States qualified eight athletes to compete in all taekwondo events.

Men

Women

Tennis

The United States was represented by five tennis players, three male and two female.

Men

Women

Triathlon

The United States qualified three male and three female triathletes.

Men

Women

Volleyball

The United States has qualified a men's and women's volleyball team.

Men
The men's team will compete in Group B.

Team
The men's indoor volleyball team is as follows:

 Outside hitters
 Tony Ciarelli
 Eric Vance
 Tri Bourne
 Matt Stork
 Jordan DuFault
 Opposite hitters
 Evan Patak
 Middle blockers
 Nick Vogel
 Matt Rawson
 Cody Loe
 Setters
 Kyle Cadwell
 Libero
 Kirk Francis

Coaches
 John Speraw – Head Coach
 Chris Jackson – Team Manager
 Jeff Nygaard – Assistant Coach
 Charlie Sullivan, Aimee Miyazawa – Trainers

Results summary

Preliminary round results

Quarterfinals

Fifth-eighth classification

Fifth place game

Final rank: 5

Women
The women's team will compete in Group B.

Team
The women's indoor volleyball team is as follows:

 Outside hitters
 Keao Burdine
 Angela Forsett
 Cynthia Barboza
 Alexandra Klineman
 Opposite hitters
 Regan Hood
 Cassidy Lichtman
 Middle blockers
 Lauren Gibbemeyer
 Jessica Jones
 Setters
 Carli Lloyd
 Courtney Thompson
 Libero
 Kayla Banwart
 Tamari Miyashiro

Coaches
 Andy Banachowski – Head Coach
 Mike Hebert, Jay Hosack – Assistant Coaches
 Jenni Hirneisen – Technical Coordinator
 Ken Sullivan – Team Leader

Results summary

Preliminary round results

Semifinals

Bronze medal match

Final rank Bronze

Water polo

The United States has qualified a men's and women's water polo team.

Men

Team
The men's water polo team is as follows:

Results
The men's team will be participating in Group B.

Preliminary round
All times are local Central Standard Time (UTC-6)

Semifinals

Gold medal match

Final rank:

Women

Team
The women's water polo team is as follows:

Results
The women's team will be participating in Group B.

Preliminary round
All times are local Central Standard Time (UTC-6)

Semifinals

Gold medal match

Final rank:

Water skiing

The United States has qualified five male and female athletes to compete.

Weightlifting

The United States has qualified six male and five female weightlifters.

Men

Women

Wrestling

The United States has qualified a total of fifteen athletes to compete in wrestling. The United States qualified six male athletes to compete in the 55 kg, 66 kg, 74 kg, 84 kg, 96 kg, and 120 kg freestyle wrestling competitions, six male athletes to compete in the 60 kg, 66 kg, 74 kg, 84 kg, 96 kg, and 120 kg Greco-Roman wrestling competitions, and three female athletes to compete in the 48 kg, 55 kg, and 63 kg freestyle wrestling competitions based on performances at the Pan American Wrestling Championship.

Men
Freestyle

Greco-Roman

Women
Freestyle

References

Nations at the 2011 Pan American Games
P
2011